Leptophobia penthica, the penthica white, is a butterfly in the family Pieridae. It is found in Colombia, Bolivia and Venezuela.

Adults have black markings on the upperside. The underside of the hindwings is bright reflective silver.

Subspecies
The following subspecies are recognised:
Leptophobia penthica penthica (Colombia)
Leptophobia penthica stamnata (Lucas, 1852) (Venezuela)
Leptophobia penthica semicaesia (C. & R. Felder, 1865) (Colombia)
Leptophobia penthica basiliola Fruhstorfer, 1908 (Bolivia)

References

Pierini
Butterflies described in 1850